Hanna Hiekal (born 23 July 2002) is an Egyptian synchronized swimmer. She competed in the 2020 Summer Olympics.

References

2002 births
Living people
Egyptian synchronized swimmers
Synchronized swimmers at the 2020 Summer Olympics
Olympic synchronized swimmers of Egypt